Werner Winter may refer to:
 Werner Winter (U-boat commander)
 Werner Winter (linguist)